All Manipur Football Association (AMFA) is the state governing body of football in Manipur. It is affiliated with the All India Football Federation, the national governing body.

The AMFA's state league is the highest and the biggest football level tournament in Manipur.

Pyramidal structures of Manipur football

State League

Manipur State League

AMFA Cup

Winners Cup

District level Super Division

District level first division

District level second division

District level three division

Stadiums and locations

Organizational officers

References

Football in Manipur
Football governing bodies in India
Sports organizations established in 1973
1973 establishments in Manipur